The Culture of Collaboration is a business book by Evan Rosen. It's the first book in The Culture of Collaboration series by Rosen. The second book in the series is The Bounty Effect: 7 Steps to the Culture of Collaboration. The Bounty Effect includes a back-cover endorsement from Steve Wozniak, co-founder of Apple.

The Culture of Collaboration is a gold medal winner in the Axiom Business Book Awards. The book explores how collaborative culture is changing business models and the nature of work. The author goes inside highly-collaborative organizations including Boeing, Toyota, the Dow Chemical Company, Procter & Gamble, DreamWorks Animation, Industrial Light & Magic, the Myelin Repair Foundation, and the Mayo Clinic. He explains how their methods can create value in almost any industry. The book also describes the trend towards real-time, spontaneous collaboration and the deserialization of interaction and work. In his preface, Rosen explains that his idea for the book originated when he was invited to the BMW engineering center in Munich during the final design stage for the X5 sports activity vehicle.  Among the terms Rosen coins in the book are mirror zones and the ten cultural elements of collaboration.

According to a review by the Axiom Business Book Awards, “Whether it is dealing with the changing trends of business or the basic cultural elements that enable collaboration, Rosen is able to offer insight on every situation.”   In his review of The Culture of Collaboration, author and business journalist James Srodes writes, “Evan Rosen, a San Francisco-based corporate strategist, has produced the best of the current crop…The culture of collaboration is already what is happening in what may be the most exciting business development since the assembly line.”

Business leaders who provided back-cover endorsements for The Culture of Collaboration include Jimmy Wales, co-founder of Wikipedia; Scott Cook, founder and Chairman of the Executive Committee of Intuit; Jeff Raikes, CEO of the Bill and Melinda Gates Foundation and former Microsoft president, Douglas E. Van Houweling, President and CEO of Internet2, and Eugene Kranz, flight director of Apollo 13.
A Russian language edition of The Culture of Collaboration is published by Ecom Publishers of Moscow.

The Bounty Effect: 7 Steps to The Culture of Collaboration provides a framework for replacing obsolete Industrial Age organizational structures based on command-and-control with collaborative organizational structures designed for the Information Age. The book gets its name from the mutiny that occurred on the H.M.S. Bounty in 1789. Rosen uses the mutiny to illustrate how exigent circumstances compel companies, governments and organizations to change their structures from command-and-control to collaborative. According to a review in Publishers Weekly:  “In his book, Rosen, an internationally recognized collaboration and communication strategist, presents seven steps to establishing a collaborative culture within an organization, moving away from the Industrial Age mentality to one better suited for the Information Age.”

References

External links
book official web site
Amazon page for The Culture of Collaboration
Amazon page for The Bounty Effect
The Culture of Collaboration, 2007.   
The Bounty Effect, 2013. 
Library Journal review of The Bounty Effect: 7 Steps to The Culture of Collaboration
Publishers Weekly review of The Bounty Effect: 7 Steps to The Culture of Collaboration
Book Review of The Culture of Collaboration by James Srodes (April 27, 2008). “Business in Books: The Good and Not-So,” The Washington Times.
“Book Review: ‘The Bounty Effect’ and ‘Corrupted Culture’” by James Srodes in The Washington Times.  
“Collaboration Takes More Than Technology” by Lee Gomes, MIT Technology Review
CNBC Interview on The Culture of Collaboration by Donny Deutsch. "Collaboration Now" primetime special. 
Avaya Innovations Magazine "Q&A with Collaboration Guru Evan Rosen" by Eric Lai
Talent Management magazine. "Can Collaboration Be Forced?" by Kellye Whitney.
Ryan, JoAnn (July 21, 2017). “From the Chamber: Collaboration is Critical,” The Register Citizen.
Communication World. “The Keys to a Collaborative Culture.” Review of The Culture of Collaboration by Kim A. Hanson.
IndustryWeek. “Collaborative Manufacturing Creates Value.”
Federal News Radio. "How to Bust Silos and Foster Collaboration." by Dorothy Ramienski.
Axiom Business Book Awards Review of The Culture of Collaboration
Russian language edition of The Culture of Collaboration by Evan Rosen, Ecom Publishers, ISBN 978-5-9790-0083-1

Culture of Collaboration, The
Business books